Arsenal Football Club is an English professional association football club based in Holloway, London. The club was formed in Woolwich in 1886 as Royal Arsenal before it was renamed Woolwich Arsenal in 1893. They became the first southern member admitted into the Football League in 1893, having spent their first four seasons solely participating in cup tournaments and friendlies. The club's name was shortened to Arsenal in 1914, a year after moving to Highbury. In spite of finishing fifth in the Second Division in 1915, Arsenal rejoined the First Division at the expense of local rivals Tottenham Hotspur when football resumed after the First World War. Since that time, they have not fallen below the first tier of the English football league system and hold the record for the longest uninterrupted period in the top flight. The club remained in the Football League until 1992, when its First Division was superseded as English football's top level by the newly formed Premier League, of which they were an inaugural member. In 2003–04, Arsenal completed a league season without a single defeat, something achieved only once before in English football, by Preston North End in 1888–89.

Arsenal's first team have competed in a number of national, and in the early part of the club's history, regionally contested leagues such as the United League, the Southern District Combination and the London League Premier Division. Their record against each club faced in these discontinued competitions, in addition to the Football League and Premier League is listed below. Arsenal's first Football League match was against Newcastle United, and they met their 85th and most recent different league opponent, A.F.C. Bournemouth, for the first time in the 2015–16 Premier League season. The team that Arsenal have played most in league competition is Manchester United, who they first met in the 1894–95 Football League season; the 83 defeats from 204 meetings is more than they have lost against any other club. Liverpool have drawn 52 league encounters with Arsenal, more than any other club. Arsenal have recorded more league victories against Everton than against any other club, having beaten them 100 times out of 202 attempts and becoming the first team in English history to attain a century of wins against another club.

Key
The table includes results of matches played by Arsenal (including under the former names of Royal Arsenal and Woolwich Arsenal) in the United League, the Southern District Combination, the London League Premier Division, the Football League and the Premier League. Matches from the abandoned 1939–40 season are excluded, as are the games in the various wartime competitions.
The name used for each opponent is the name they had when Arsenal most recently played a league match against them. Results against each opponent include results against that club under any former name. For example, results against Birmingham City include matches played against Small Heath (1888–1905) and Birmingham (1905–1945).
The columns headed "First" and "Last" contain the first and most recent seasons in which Arsenal played league matches against each opponent.
P = matches played; W = matches won; D = matches drawn; L = matches lost; Win% = percentage of total matches won
  Clubs with this background and symbol in the "Opponent" column are Arsenal's divisional rivals in the current season.
  Clubs with this background and symbol in the "Opponent" column are defunct.

All-time league record
Statistics correct as of matches played on 28 August 2021.

Footnotes

References
General

Specific

League record by opponent
Arsenal